USS Investigator (AGR/YAGR-9) was a , converted from a Liberty Ship, acquired by the US Navy in 1954. She was reconfigured as a radar picket ship and assigned to radar picket duty in the North Atlantic Ocean as part of the Distant Early Warning Line.

Construction
Investigator (YAGR-9) was laid down on 28 November 1944, under a Maritime Commission (MARCOM) contract, MC hull 2336, as the Liberty Ship Charles A. Draper, by J.A. Jones Construction, Panama City, Florida. She was launched 9 January 1945; sponsored by Mrs. E. L. Cills; and delivered 24 January 1945, to the Polarus Steamship Co., Inc.

Service history
The ship carried replacement aircraft and cargo until the end of the war. She entered the National Defense Reserve Fleet, James River Reserve Fleet, Lee Hall, Virginia, 26 October 1945.

After a brief period of service in 1947, she entered the Reserve Fleet at Mobile, Alabama, until she was acquired by the US Navy, 2 July 1956. She was converted to a radar picket ship at the Charleston Navy Yard, Charleston, South Carolina, and commissioned Investigator (YAGR-9), 16 January 1957.
 
Equipped with the latest in air search and tracking systems, the ship conducted her shakedown training in the Caribbean, and departed Guantanamo Bay, for her new home port, Davisville, Rhode Island. Investigator began her operational pattern of three- to four-week cruises in the North Atlantic Ocean as the seaward extension of the Continental Air Defense Command's (CONAD) air early warning system. Operating with search aircraft, she could detect, track, and report aircraft at long ranges, and could control high speed US interceptor aircraft and direct them to targets.

The ship was reclassified AGR-9, effective 28 September 1958. She continued radar picket station duties for CONAD, detecting and tracking inbound airborne objects and controlling jet interceptor aircraft until decommissioned 29 March 1965.

Decommissioning
Her name was struck from the Navy List 1 April 1965. She was transferred the same day to the US Maritime Commission (MARCOM) and entered the Hudson River Reserve Fleet, Jones Point, New York, where she remained until sold for scrapping in Spain, 15 May 1971.

Military awards and honors

Investigators crew was eligible for the following medals:
 National Defense Service Medal
 Navy Expeditionary Medal (2 awards)

See also 
 United States Navy
 Radar picket

References

Bibliography

External links 
 

 

Liberty ships
Ships built in Panama City, Florida
1945 ships
World War II merchant ships of the United States
Guardian-class radar picket ships
Cold War auxiliary ships of the United States
Hudson River Reserve Fleet
James River Reserve Fleet
Mobile Reserve Fleet